The SNECMA 14R was a 14-cylinder two-row air-cooled radial engine developed in France just prior to the start of World War II from the Gnome-Rhône 14N.  The 14N radial engine was itself an improved version of the popular pre-war Gnome-Rhône 14K Mistral Major series; designed and manufactured by Gnome et Rhône, a major French aircraft engine manufacturer whose origins pre-date the First World War.

The improved 14R was initially known as the Gnome-Rhône 14P and then the Gnome-Rhône 14R. There were several improvements such as the introduction of a longer crankshaft and crankcase with a centre bearing, an increase in cylinder capacity, and a two-speed compressor. These changes allowed the engine to deliver 1,400hp at take-off and 1,300hp at 1,500m (1st gear) and 1200hp at 4000m (2nd gear). This came at the cost of a much increased total weight. It was expected that further development, such as the introduction of higher grade fuels, would lead to a power output of 1,660hp at low altitude.

With the Fall of France, engine development was stopped under the occupation.  After the war, development recommenced; however production of this engine after 1945 was transferred to the newly formed SNECMA and the engine was renamed the SNECMA 14R.

Variants
14R-04Improved higher performance using 92 Octane fuel. 14N with 2-speed supercharge (6.5:1 and 9:1), LH rotation,  for take-off.
14R-05RH rotation version of 14R-4.
14R-08RPM increased from 2,400 to 2,600 improving power output.  LH rotation.
14R-09RH rotation version of 14R-08
14R-24LH rotation, .
14R-25RH rotation version of 14R-24.
14R-26LH rotation, .
14R-27RH rotation version of 14R-26.
14R-28LH rotation, .
14R-29RH rotation version of 14R-28.
14R-32LH rotation
14R-100
14R-200LH rotation
14R-201RH rotation
14R-210
28T-128 cylinder, double 14R-24 engines placed back-to-back with co-axial contra-rotating propeller shafts, direct fuel injection, 2-speed supercharger,   displacement, delivering  for take-off using 100/130 octane fuel.

Specifications (14R-04)

See also

References

1930s aircraft piston engines
Aircraft air-cooled radial piston engines
14R
14R